Nagathan  is a village in the southern state of Karnataka, India. It is located in the Bijapur taluk of Bijapur district in Karnataka.

Demographics
 India census, Nagathan had a population of 7255 with 3703 males and 3552 females.
There is a belief among the people that, cobras resided in groups at this place. That is how this village has come to be known as NagaThan. Naga meaning cobra and Thana meaning place where they reside in groups.  
In this village there are three (Birasidswer, Udayaswer, Mallikarjun Swamy) famous temples. Udayaswer temple was built by the Bahumani sultanate in the 16th century. Birasidswer and Paramananda fairs are conducted every year during the time of Diwali. Fairs are grand and lot of people from neighboring villages and far away places flow in to be part of these fairs. There are many masjids as well in this place where Muslims and Hindus live in harmony.

This village located on Bijapur-indi Road.  It is considerably bigger than its neighboring villages consisting of 1,414 households.  Nagathan assembly constituency which was created in 2008-09 stands as a testimony to its dominance over neighboring villages both in area and population.  It belongs to Nagthan Vidhana Sabha constituency, which is a reserved constituency Scheduled Caste. Devanand Fulasing Chavan of Janata Dal (Secular) is the sitting MLA from this constituency.

As it is nearer to the Karnataka-Maharashtra border, many relations are formed with families across the state through marriages. Village has basic infrastructure with a primary school, a government hospital, a high school and a PU college. Private schools too have popped up recently.
 
Agriculture is the main livelihood for most of the families even though the scarcity of water bothers them more often than not. Variety of crops such as Jawar, Wheat, Cotton, Sunflower etc. are grown.  Nearest city is Bijapur which is 17 km away.

References

External links
 http://Bijapur.nic.in/

Villages in Bijapur district, Karnataka